Avis Favaro (born February, 1960) is Canada's longest serving on air medical correspondent – now with CTV National News  since 1992. She has won numerous awards including a Gemini Award.

Favaro previously worked as medical correspondent for the Global Television Network where she began her career in 1982 as a writer/reporter.

She graduated from the University of Western Ontario (aka Western University) with a degree in history and received her Master's degree in Arts/Journalism, also from UWO.

Selected awards and nominations
2021   Nominated for Canadian Screen Award for COVID ICU
2021   Nominated for RTDNA for COVID ICU

2019   Winner Registered Nurses Association of Ontario Media Awards  "Cannabis-savvy nurses help Canadians explore medical marijuana"

2018   McMaster University Grants Honorary PhD School of Nursing  to Avis Favaro

2016   Nominated for Canadian Association of Journalists Award  for W5's "The Comeback-Gordie Howe's Stem Cell Treatment"

2016   Nominated for Canadian Screen Award for Best News or Information Segment for W5's "The Comeback=Gordie Howe's Stem Cell Treatment"

2015   Nominated for Canadian Screen Award for Best News or Information Segment for W5's "Sleeping Sickness"

2015   Winner Registered Nurses' Association of Ontario Award for Excellence in Health Care Reporting for "Butterfly Child"

2013   Winner Registered Nurses Association of Ontario Awards for Excellence in Health Reporting  "A City's Pain"

2012   Winner Registered Nurses Association of Ontario Awards for Health Care reporting "Seniors Poverty Lottery"

2012   Winner of RTNDA (Radio Television News Director Association of Canada Award) for W5's "Reach for the Top" documentary on double amputee Spencer West's climb up Mount Kilimanjaro

2011   Winner Registered Nurses' Association of Ontario Award for Excellence in Health Care Reporting for "Skin Cells to Blood"

2009   Winner Canadian Medical Association and Canadian Nurses Association Media Awards for Excellence in Health Reporting for "BPA found in Food Cans"

2008   Finalist Canadian Association of Journalists Award for Outstanding Journalism in Canada (2008)

2008   Winner RTNDA (Radio Television News Directors Association of Canada Award) for short feature "Carly's Story"  CTV National News

2008   Finalist for Freddie Award – International Health and Medical Media Awards for "Carly's Story" CTV National News

2007  Wi nner  -Canadian Medical Association and Canadian Nurses Association Media Awards for Excellence in Health Reporting Diabetes and Amputation" and "Lighting the Darkness"  CTV National News and W5

2004   Nominated Gemini Awards- Best Reportage – " Trans Fats" CTV National News

2003   Nominated Gemini Awards- Best Reportage – (TBA)

2001  Nominated Gemini Awards –  Best Information Segment "Hidden Epidemic" W5

2000  Winner  International Health & Medical Awards – Issues and Ethics Category for "Whistleblower Doctor"

2000  Nominated Gemini Awards- Best Information Segment  "Deadly Diagnosis" W5

2000  Finalist International Health and Medical Awards . "Talking bathrooms" CTV National News

1999  Nominated Gemini Awards – Best Reportage "Whistleblower Doctor" CTV National News

1998. Winner- Gemini Awards "Young Tissue Extract" CTV National News

1989  Winner – RTNDA Dan McArthur Award – "Neonatal Crisis" Global Television News

External links
 CTV.ca biography of Avis Favaro

1960 births
Canadian television reporters and correspondents
Canadian Screen Award winning journalists
Living people
University of Western Ontario alumni
Canadian women television journalists
CTV Television Network people